Obesotoma gigas is a species of sea snail, a marine gastropod mollusk in the family Mangeliidae.

Description
The length of the shell attains 14 mm.

Distribution
This species occurs off Svalbard and Arctic Russia.

References

 Verkruzen, T.A. (1882) Buccinum L. Jahrbuch. der Deutschen Malakozoologischen Gesellschaft, 9: 203–221, 356–365.
 Gofas, S.; Le Renard, J.; Bouchet, P. (2001). Mollusca, in: Costello, M.J. et al. (Ed.) (2001). European register of marine species: a check-list of the marine species in Europe and a bibliography of guides to their identification. Collection Patrimoines Naturels, 50: pp. 180–213

External links
  Tucker, J.K. 2004 Catalog of recent and fossil turrids (Mollusca: Gastropoda). Zootaxa 682:1-1295.

gigas
Gastropods described in 1875